Kangfu Lu station, is a station of Line 1 of the Xi'an Metro. It started operations on 15 September 2013.

References

Railway stations in Shaanxi
Railway stations in China opened in 2013
Xi'an Metro stations